Jerry Verno (26 July 1895 – 29 June 1975) was a British film actor. He appeared in 39 films between 1931 and 1966, including five films directed by Michael Powell, and two with Alfred Hitchcock.

He was born in London.

As well as appearing in films, he also took the role of Mr. McGregor in a dramatised series of Beatrix Potter tales produced by Fiona Bentley and recorded by HMV Junior Record Club (words by David Croft, music by Cyril Ornadel).

Filmography

 Two Crowded Hours (1931, Short) – Jim
 The Beggar Student (1931) – Jan Janski
 My Friend the King (1932) – Jim
 Hotel Splendide (1932) – Jerry Mason
 His Wife's Mother (1932) – Henry
 There Goes the Bride (1932) – Clark – the chauffeur
 His Lordship (1932) – Bert Gibbs
 The Life of the Party (1934) – Arthur Bleeby
 Lieutenant Daring R.N. (1935) – AB Swallow
 Royal Cavalcade (1935) – Taxpayer
 The 39 Steps (1935) – Commercial Traveller No. 2
 Sweeney Todd: The Demon Barber of Fleet Street (1936) – Pearley
 Ourselves Alone (1936) – Private Parsley
 Broken Blossoms (1936) – Bert
 Gypsy Melody (1936) – Madame Beatrice
 Pagliacci (1936) – Beppe, comic trouper
 Sensation (1936) – Spikey
 Farewell Again (1937) – Pvt. George Judd
 Non-Stop New York (1937) – Steward
 Young and Innocent (1937) – Lorry Driver
 Oh Boy! (1938) – Shopwalker
 Old Mother Riley in Paris (1938) – Joe
 Queer Cargo (1938) – Slops
 Sidewalks of London (1938) – Drunk (uncredited)
 Anything to Declare? (1938) – Hugo Guppy
 The Gables Mystery (1938) – Potts
 Mountains O'Mourne (1938) – Dip Evans
 The Chinese Bungalow (1940) – Stubbins
 Girl in the News (1940) – Charlie – Prisoner in Police Car (uncredited)
 The Common Touch (1941) – Office Messenger
 The Red Shoes (1948) – Stage-Door Keeper
 The Perfect Woman (1949) – Football Fan on Underground
 Dear Mr. Prohack (1949) – Taxi Driver (uncredited)
 The Belles of St Trinian's (1954) – Alf – the Bookmaker
 After the Ball (1957) – Harry Ball
 Watch it, Sailor! (1961) – Cab Driver (uncredited)
 A Place to Go (1963) – Nobby Knowles
 The Plague of the Zombies (1966) – Landlord (uncredited)

References

External links

1895 births
1975 deaths
English male film actors
20th-century English male actors